Diego Ochoa (born 16 February 2002) is a Mexican college soccer player who plays as a defender for Boston College.

Career statistics

Club

Notes

References

External links 
 Boston College Profile

2002 births
Living people
Mexican footballers
Mexican expatriate footballers
Association football defenders
Boston College Eagles men's soccer players
LA Galaxy players
Loudoun United FC players
Mexican expatriate sportspeople in the United States
Expatriate soccer players in the United States